A. W. Hackel, born Aaron William Hackel (December 18, 1882 – October 22, 1959) was an American film producer who founded Supreme Pictures in 1934.

Biography
He was born in Ulanów, Nisko County, Podkarpackie Voivodeship, Poland 

In 1934 Hackel formed Supreme Pictures where he contracted Bob Steele for 32 of his westerns, for example Alias John Law in 1935. Hackel also produced 16 Westerns with Johnny Mack Brown.

In 1936 Republic Pictures needed more westerns and made a deal with Hackel, who released his films through Republic. After the demise of Supreme Pictures in 1942, Hackel released through Monogram Pictures.  All of his pictures were westerns until Am I Guilty? (1940), a race film. He followed it with numerous crime dramas including  The Flaming Urge (1953), a crime film.

Partial filmography

The Brand of Hate (1934)
Alias John Law (1935)
Trail of Terror (1935)
Between Men (1935)
The Courageous Avenger (1935)
Branded a Coward (1935)
The Kid Ranger (1936)
Rogue of the Range (1936)
The Law Rides (1936)
The Gun Ranger (1936)
Doomed at Sundown (1937)
 The Gambling Terror (1937)
Desert Patrol (1938)
 Am I Guilty? (1940), a race film
Murder by Invitation (1941)
Phantom Killer (film) (1942)
The Living Ghost (1942)
A Gentle Gangster (1943)
Shadow of Suspicion (1944)
The Flaming Urge (1953), a crime drama

Notes

External links 
 

1882 births
1959 deaths
Austro-Hungarian emigrants to the United States
American film producers
Defunct American film studios